Back for the Attack is the fourth studio album by American heavy metal band Dokken, released on November 2, 1987 through Elektra Records. A remastered edition featuring a bonus track was reissued in 2009 through Warner Music Japan. It is the band's best-selling album, reaching No. 13 on the U.S. Billboard 200 and remaining on that chart for 33 weeks. Three singles also charted on Billboard'''s Mainstream Rock chart: "Dream Warriors" reached No. 22, "Prisoner" at No. 37, and "Burning Like a Flame" at No. 20 as well as No. 72 on the Billboard Hot 100. Back for the Attack was certified Gold and Platinum on January 14, 1988.

The single "Dream Warriors" was originally released in February 1987 as the theme song for the horror film A Nightmare on Elm Street 3: Dream Warriors. The album title for Back for the Attack was taken from an earlier Dokken song of the same name, recorded during the sessions for Under Lock and Key (1985) and released as the B-side to "Dream Warriors". It was later included in the 2009 remastered edition of the album as a bonus track.

Critical reception

Barry Weber at AllMusic gave Back for the Attack'' three stars out of five, saying that it "certainly isn't Dokken's greatest album, yet it remains a worthwhile listen". He praised the band for sounding "tighter than they ever have before", with frontman Don Dokken and guitarist George Lynch being "at the top of their game." Canadian journalist Martin Popoff praised the album, which "offers length, variation and a sense of ambition as never before", and called it "one of those lost records brimming with bravado" but not so unique to be "one's life soundtrack". He added that the "excruciating" circumstances of its recording took their toll as the band tried to assemble "a more competent, mature, substantial record". 

The album was ranked number 12 on Metal Rules list of the Top 50 Glam Metal Albums.

Track listing

Personnel

Dokken
Don Dokken – lead vocals
George Lynch – guitar
Jeff Pilson – bass, background vocals
Wild Mick – drums, background vocals

Production
Neil Kernon – producer, engineer
Toby Wright, Matt Freeman, Eddie Ashworth, Andy Udoff, Steve Klein, Stan Katayama – assistant engineers
Steve Thompson, Michael Barbiero – mixing at Bearsville Studios, Bearsville, New York
Bob Ludwig – mastering at Masterdisk, New York

Charts

Album

Singles

Certifications

References

Dokken albums
1987 albums
Elektra Records albums
Albums produced by Neil Kernon